Loewi is a surname, and may refer to:

 Fiona Loewi, Canadian actress
 Otto Loewi, German pharmacologist

See also
 Loewy
 Löwe (disambiguation)

Levite surnames
Jewish surnames
Yiddish-language surnames